Stephen Drew Sutton (born June 30, 1983) is an American former professional baseball infielder and outfielder. He played in Major League Baseball for the Cincinnati Reds, Cleveland Indians, Boston Red Sox, Tampa Bay Rays, and Pittsburgh Pirates.

Career

Houston Astros
Sutton is a graduate of Baylor University. He was drafted by the Houston Astros in the 15th round of the 2004 Major League Baseball Draft.

Cincinnati Reds
He was acquired by the Cincinnati Reds for Jeff Keppinger during the 2009 Spring Training.  He made his major-league debut for the Reds on July 2, 2009.

Cleveland Indians
On August 6, 2010, Sutton was claimed off waivers by the Cleveland Indians.

Sutton was outrighted by the Indians to the Triple-A Columbus Clippers on November 3, 2010. He refused his minor league assignment and subsequently filed for free agency.

Boston Red Sox
Sutton signed a minor league contract with the Boston Red Sox on November 22, 2010 and was called up on May 20, 2011.

Atlanta Braves
The Atlanta Braves signed him to a minor league contract on November 22, 2011.

Pittsburgh Pirates
The Pittsburgh Pirates purchased Sutton from the Braves on May 20, 2012.

Tampa Bay Rays
The Tampa Bay Rays traded for Sutton from the Pittsburgh Pirates on May 21, 2012 for a player to be named later or cash considerations. On June 22, 2012, Sutton was designated for assignment by the Rays.

Back to the Pittsburgh Pirates
Sutton was re-acquired by the Pittsburgh Pirates on June 24, 2012, this time off waivers. On July 3, 2012, Sutton hit his first career walk-off home run, solo home run off of Wesley Wright.

In October 2012, Sutton elected minor league free agency.

Return to the Red Sox
Sutton signed with the Boston Red Sox in December 2012. Sutton spent 2013 with Triple-A Pawtucket, and began the year at third base before being moved to first base in May and finishing the year there. In 102 games, he hit .245 with 2 HR and 48 RBI. He also pitched in 3 additional games, going 0-2 while giving up 4 runs in 5 innings and striking out 2. He announced his retirement from professional baseball on February 17, 2014.

References

External links

1983 births
Living people
Cincinnati Reds players
Cleveland Indians players
Boston Red Sox players
Tampa Bay Rays players
Pittsburgh Pirates players
People from El Dorado, Arkansas
Major League Baseball shortstops
Baseball players from Arkansas
Texarkana Bulldogs baseball players
Baylor Bears baseball players
Tri-City ValleyCats players
Salem Avalanche players
Lexington Legends players
Corpus Christi Hooks players
Round Rock Express players
Louisville Bats players
Columbus Clippers players
Pawtucket Red Sox players
Gwinnett Braves players
Indianapolis Indians players